Christopher Makos (born 1948) is an American photographer and visual artist. Makos is known for his photographs of Queer icons and pop stars, and of the male body. Makos apprenticed with photographer Man Ray, and assisted and collaborated with Andy Warhol.

Makos's work has been in the permanent collections of more than 100 museums and major private collections, including those of Malcolm Forbes, Pedro Almodóvar, and Gianni Versace. His photographs of Warhol, Haring, Tennessee Williams, and others have been auctioned regularly. Makos lives in the West Village area of New York City.

Career

Chris Makos was born in 1948 in Lowell, Massachusetts, but grew up in California before moving to Paris.

In 1976, he worked as an apprentice with Man Ray in Fregenae, Italy. He met Andy Warhol in 1977, and became more visible in the Warhol social circle around 1979 and 1980. During that time Makos worked a photo assistant for Warhol and was involved with the publication of the 1979 art photo book, "Andy Warhol's Exposures". His book, Warhol: A Photographic Memoir (1989, New American Library), chronicled his friendship and extensive travels with Warhol in photos.

Since the early 1970s, Makos has worked at developing a style of boldly graphic photojournalism. His photographs have been the subject of numerous exhibitions both in galleries and museums throughout the United States, Europe and Japan and have appeared in countless magazines and newspapers worldwide. He has been a seminal figure in the contemporary art scene in New York. He is responsible for introducing the work of Jean-Michel Basquiat and Keith Haring to Andy Warhol.

Makos' photographs have been published in Interview, Rolling Stone, House & Garden, Connoisseur, New York Magazine, Esquire, Genre and People, among others. His portrait of Warhol wrapped in a flag was featured on the front cover of the Spring 1990 issue of the Smithsonian Studies, the academic journal of the Smithsonian Institution. Makos' Icons portfolio is a collection of silkscreen portraits of Andy Warhol, Elizabeth Taylor, Salvador Dalí, John Lennon, and Mick Jagger.

Publications

References

Sources
Makos, Christopher. Exhibitionism. New York: Glitterati Incorporated, 2004. 
Makos, Christopher. Equipose. New York: Glitterati Incorporated, 2005. 
Solberg, Paul. Bloom. New York: Glitterati Incorporated, 2005.

External links

Makos Studios
Flopeters Gallery exhibition
The Hilton Brothers

1948 births
Living people
Artists from California
Artists from New York City
Artists from Lowell, Massachusetts
American gay artists
American LGBT photographers
21st-century American LGBT people
Photographers from New York City